Sean McKeown (1944 - July 11, 2002), was a herpetologist in California, United States.

Education
Sean McKeown was born in Southern California. He held degrees in zoology and anthropology from California State University.

Career
McKeown worked as a supervising herpetologist at the Honolulu Zoo during the 1970s and early 1980s. During this time, he developed a number of breeding programs for some lizard and tortoise species. For his commitment to captive breeding the Madagascar angulated tortoise (Geochelone yniphora), McKeown received the AAZPA conservation award. McKeown received zoo awards for being the first to breed Madagascar ploughshare tortoises. He also administered the first long-term breeding program for the Madagascar ground boas.

McKeown undertook field work for the wildlife departments of Aruba, New Zealand, the Seychelles, Mauritius, Hawaii, and Guam.

He was curator at the herpetarium at Chaffee Zoological Gardens in Fresno, California. McKeown published frequently on diverse herpetological topics and was managing editor of The Vivarium magazine.

Works
A Field Guide to the Reptiles and Amphibians of the Hawaiian Islands, Diamond Head Publishing, Inc., Los Osos, California .
The general care and maintenance of day geckos, Advanced Vivarium Systems, 1993, Lakeside CA.

References

1944 births
2002 deaths
American herpetologists
20th-century American zoologists